SKSD may refer to:

Shramik Krishak Samajbadi Dal
Sistem Komunikasi Satelit Domestik